Following the 1180 Battle of Uji, in which Minamoto no Yorimasa fought a small Taira army with the help of monks from the Mii-dera and other temples, the victorious Taira  sought revenge.  They burned the Miidera temple, before moving on to Nara, where they "set fire to the monastic complexes of Kōfuku-ji and Tōdai-ji."

The Taira were opposed by warrior monks from nearly every major monastery and temple in Nara. Taira no Shigehira and Tomomori, both sons of Kiyomori, head of the clan, commanded the siege.

The monks dug ditches in the roads, and built many forms of improvised defenses. They fought primarily with bow & arrow, and naginata, while the Taira were on horseback, giving them a great advantage. Despite the monks' superior numbers, and their strategic defenses, their enemy succeeded in destroying nearly every temple in the city, including the Kōfuku-ji and Tōdai-ji.  Only the Shōsōin survived.

The Heike Monogatari laments the destruction of the Tōdai-ji's Daibutsu (Great Buddha statue):

In all, 3,500 people died in the burning of Nara.

References

 Turnbull, Stephen (2003). 'Japanese Warrior Monks AD 949-1603'. Oxford: Osprey Publishing.

1180s in Japan
1180 in Asia
Conflicts in 1180
Nara
Nara 1180
Anti-Buddhism
Incidents in the history of Buddhism in Japan
Buddhism in the Heian period